The Soling was a sailing event on the Sailing at the 1976 Summer Olympics program in Kingston, Ontario . Seven races were scheduled. 72 sailors, on 24 boats, from 24 nations competed.

Results

Daily standings

Notes

References 
 
 
 
 

Soling
Olympic Soling Regattas